The Zhaoshang Cup is a Go competition between China and South Korea.

Outline
The Zhaoshang Cup is a team competition between players from the Zhongguo Qiyuan and Hanguk Kiwon. Each team is made up of six players (five players and one substitute).

Past winners and runners-up

References

International Go competitions